Robert Gregory Housler Jr. (born March 17, 1988) is a former American football tight end. He played college football at Florida Atlantic and was drafted by the Arizona Cardinals in the third round of the 2011 NFL Draft. He has also played for the Cleveland Browns, Chicago Bears and New England Patriots.

Early years
He was born on March 17, 1988, in El Paso, Texas. He went to high school at Judson HS, and then went to college at Florida Atlantic.

Professional career

Arizona Cardinals
Housler was drafted by the Arizona Cardinals in the third round (69th overall) in the 2011 NFL Draft. In four seasons with the Cardinals, he totaled 105 receptions for 1,133 yards and one touchdown.

Cleveland Browns
On April 9, 2015, Housler signed a one-year deal with the Cleveland Browns. He was placed on injured reserve on November 4, 2015, with a hamstring injury, and was waived on November 17.

Chicago Bears
Housler was signed by the Chicago Bears on December 8, 2015. On March 14, 2016, he was re-signed by the Bears. He was released by the Bears on September 3, 2016.

New England Patriots
On January 19, 2017, Housler signed a reserve/future contract with the Patriots. He was released by the Patriots on May 17, 2017.

Statistics
Source: NFL.com

References

External links
 Cleveland Browns bio
 Arizona Cardinals bio
 Florida Atlantic Owls bio

1988 births
Living people
Players of American football from El Paso, Texas
Judson High School alumni
American football tight ends
Florida Atlantic Owls football players
Arizona Cardinals players
Cleveland Browns players
Chicago Bears players
New England Patriots players